

Events

Pre-1600
 887 – Berengar I is elected as king of Italy by the lords of Lombardy. He is crowned with the Iron Crown of Lombardy at Pavia.
1481 – Battle of Westbroek: An army of 4,000 to 5,000 soldiers raised by David of Burgundy, Bishop of Utrecht, attacks an armed mob of people from nearby Utrecht who were trying to avenge the massacre of the inhabitants of Westbroek.

1601–1900
1704 – Second Battle of Anandpur: In the Second Battle of Anandpur, Aurangzeb's two generals, Wazir Khan and Zaberdast Khan executed two children of Guru Gobind Singh, Zorawar Singh aged eight and Fateh Singh aged five, by burying them alive into a wall.
1709 – The opera Agrippina by George Frideric Handel premiered in Venice.
1776 – American Revolutionary War: In the Battle of Trenton, the Continental Army attacks and successfully defeats a garrison of Hessian forces.
1790 – Louis XVI of France gives his public assent to Civil Constitution of the Clergy during the French Revolution.
1793 – Second Battle of Wissembourg: France defeats Austria.
1799 – Henry Lee III's eulogy to George Washington in congress declares him as "first in war, first in peace and first in the hearts of his countrymen".
1805 – Austria and France sign the Treaty of Pressburg.
1806 – Battles of Pultusk and Golymin: Russian forces hold French forces under Napoleon.
1811 – A theater fire in Richmond, Virginia kills the Governor of Virginia George William Smith and the president of the First National Bank of Virginia Abraham B. Venable.
1825 – Advocates of liberalism in Russia rise up against Czar Nicholas I in the Decembrist revolt, but are later suppressed.
1860 – First Rules derby is held between Sheffield F.C. and Hallam F.C., the oldest football fixture in the world.
1861 – American Civil War: The Trent Affair: Confederate diplomatic envoys James Murray Mason and John Slidell are freed by the United States government, thus heading off a possible war between the United States and the United Kingdom.
1862 – American Civil War: The Battle of Chickasaw Bayou begins as General William Tecumseh Sherman begins landing his troops.
  1862   – The largest mass-hanging in U.S. history took place in Mankato, Minnesota, where 38 Native Americans died.
1871 – Thespis, the first Gilbert and Sullivan collaboration, debuts.
1898 – Marie and Pierre Curie announce the isolation of radium.

1901–present
1919 – Babe Ruth of the Boston Red Sox is sold to the New York Yankees by owner Harry Frazee, allegedly establishing the Curse of the Bambino superstition.
1941 – U.S. President Franklin D. Roosevelt signs a bill establishing the fourth Thursday in November as Thanksgiving Day in the United States.
1943 – World War II: German warship Scharnhorst is sunk off of Norway's North Cape after a battle against major Royal Navy forces.
1944 – World War II: George S. Patton's Third Army breaks the encirclement of surrounded U.S. forces at Bastogne, Belgium.
1948 – Cardinal József Mindszenty is arrested in Hungary and accused of treason and conspiracy.
  1948   – The last Soviet troops withdraw from North Korea.
1963 – The Beatles' "I Want to Hold Your Hand" and "I Saw Her Standing There" are released in the United States, marking the beginning of Beatlemania on an international level.
1966 – The first Kwanzaa is celebrated by Maulana Karenga, the chair of Black Studies at California State University, Long Beach.
1968 – The Communist Party of the Philippines is established by Jose Maria Sison, breaking away from the Partido Komunista ng Pilipinas-1930.
1972 – Vietnam War: As part of Operation Linebacker II, 120 American B-52 Stratofortress bombers attacked Hanoi, including 78 launched from Andersen Air Force Base in Guam, the largest single combat launch in Strategic Air Command history.
1975 – Tu-144, the world's first commercial supersonic aircraft, surpassing Mach 2, goes into service.
1978 – The inaugural Paris-Dakar Rally begins.
1980 – Witnesses report the first of several sightings of unexplained lights near RAF Woodbridge, in Rendlesham Forest, Suffolk, England, United Kingdom, an incident called "Britain's Roswell".
1989 – United Express Flight 2415 crashes on approach to the Tri-Cities Airport in Pasco, Washington, killing all six people on board.
1991 – The Supreme Soviet of the Soviet Union meets and formally dissolves the Soviet Union, ending the Cold War.
1994 – Four Armed Islamic Group hijackers seize control of Air France Flight 8969. When the plane lands at Marseille, a French Gendarmerie assault team boards the aircraft and kills the hijackers.
1998 – Iraq announces its intention to fire upon U.S. and British warplanes that patrol the northern and southern no-fly zones.
1999 – The storm Lothar sweeps across Central Europe, killing 137 and causing US$1.3 billion in damage.
2003 – The 6.6  Bam earthquake shakes southeastern Iran with a maximum Mercalli intensity of IX (Violent), leaving more than 26,000 dead and 30,000 injured.
2004 – The 9.1–9.3  Indian Ocean earthquake shakes northern Sumatra with a maximum Mercalli intensity of IX (Violent). One of the largest observed tsunamis, it affected coastal and partially mainland areas of Thailand, India, Sri Lanka, the Maldives, Malaysia, Myanmar, Bangladesh, and Indonesia; death toll is estimated at 227,898.
  2004   – Orange Revolution: The final run-off election in Ukraine is held under heavy international scrutiny.
2006 – Two earthquakes in Hengchun, Taiwan measuring 7.0 and 6.9 on the Richter scale kill two and disrupt telecommunications across Asia.
2012 – China opens the world's longest high-speed rail route, which links Beijing and Guangzhou.
2015 – During the December 2015 North American storm complex, a Tornado Outbreak occurs in the DFW Metroplex, with the most notable tornadoes being an EF2, EF3, and an EF4. About a dozen people died due to various reasons, 10 of which due to the EF4, which did substantial damage to the suburb of Rowlett.

Births

Pre-1600
1194 – Frederick II, Holy Roman Emperor (d. 1250)
1446 – Charles de Valois, Duke de Berry, French noble (d. 1472)
1526 – Rose Lok, businesswoman and Protestant exile (d.1613)
1532 – Wilhelm Xylander, German scholar and academic (d. 1576)
1536 – Yi I, Korean philosopher and scholar (d. 1584)
1537 – Albert, Count of Nassau-Weilburg (d. 1593)
1581 – Philip III, Landgrave of Hesse-Butzbach (d. 1643)

1601–1900
1618 – Elisabeth of the Palatinate, German princess, philosopher, and Calvinist (d. 1680)
1628 – John Page, English Colonial politician (d. 1692)
1646 – Robert Bolling, English/English Colonial merchant and planter (d. 1709)
1687 – Johann Georg Pisendel, German violinist and composer (d. 1755)
1716 – Thomas Gray, English poet and scholar (d. 1771)
  1716   – Jean François de Saint-Lambert, French soldier and philosopher (d. 1803)
1723 – Friedrich Melchior, Baron von Grimm, German-French author and playwright (d. 1807)
1737 – Prince Josias of Saxe-Coburg-Saalfeld (d. 1815)
1751 – Lord George Gordon, English lieutenant and politician (d. 1793)
  1751   – Clemens Maria Hofbauer, Austrian priest, missionary, and saint (d. 1820)
1769 – Ernst Moritz Arndt, German writer and poet (d. 1860)
1780 – Mary Somerville, Scottish mathematician, astronomer, and author (d. 1872)
1785 – Étienne Constantin de Gerlache, Belgian lawyer and politician, 1st Prime Minister of Belgium (d. 1871)
1782 – Philaret Drozdov, Russian metropolitan and saint (d. 1867)
1791 – Charles Babbage, English mathematician and engineer, invented the Difference engine (d. 1871)
1803 – Friedrich Reinhold Kreutzwald, Estonian physician and author (d. 1882)
1819 – E. D. E. N. Southworth, American author and educator (d. 1899)
1820 – Dion Boucicault, Irish actor and playwright (d. 1890)
1837 – Morgan Bulkeley, American soldier and politician, 54th Governor of Connecticut (d. 1922)
  1837   – George Dewey, American admiral (d. 1917)
1852 – Johannes François Snelleman, Dutch zoologist, orientalist, and ethnographer (d. 1938)
1853 – René Bazin, French author and academic (d. 1932)
1854 – José Yves Limantour, Mexican financier and politician, Mexican Secretary of Finance (d. 1935)
1859 – William Stephens, American lawyer and politician, 24th Governor of California (d. 1944)
1863 – Charles Pathé, French record producer, co-founded Pathé Records (d. 1957)
1864 – Yun Chi-ho, Korean activist and politician (d. 1945)
1867 – Phan Bội Châu, Vietnamese activist (d. 1940)
1869 – Mathieu Cordang, Dutch cyclist (d. 1942)
1872 – Norman Angell, English journalist, academic, and politician, Nobel Prize laureate (d. 1967)
1873 – Thomas Wass, English cricketer (d. 1953)
1874 – Khan Bahadur Ahsanullah, Bangladeshi theologian and academic (d. 1965)
1883 – Maurice Utrillo, French painter (d. 1955)
1885 – Bazoline Estelle Usher, African-American educator (d. 1992)
1887 – Arthur Percival, English general (d. 1966)
1888 – Marius Canard, French orientalist and historian (d. 1982)
1890 – Konstantinos Georgakopoulos, Greek lawyer and politician, Prime Minister of Greece (d. 1973)
  1890   – Percy Hodge, English runner (d. 1967)
1891 – Henry Miller, American author and painter (d. 1980)
1892 – Don Barclay, American actor and illustrator (d. 1975)
1893 – Mao Zedong, Chinese politician, Chairman of the Chinese Communist Party (d. 1976)
1894 – Jean Toomer, American author and poet (d. 1967)
1900 – Evelyn Bark, leading member of the British Red Cross, first female recipient of the CMG (d. 1993)

1901–present
1901 – Elmar Muuk, Estonian linguist and author (d. 1941)
1902 – Anatoli Lvovich Kaplan, Russian painter and sculptor (d. 1980)
1903 – Elisha Cook, Jr., American actor (d. 1995)
1904 – Alejo Carpentier, Swiss-Cuban musicologist and author (d. 1980)
1905 – William Loeb III, American publisher (d. 1981)
1907 – Albert Gore, Sr., American lawyer and politician (d. 1998)
1908 – Ralph Hill, American runner (d. 1994)
1909 – Matt Gordy, American pole vaulter (d. 1989)
1910 – Imperio Argentina, Argentine-Spanish actress and singer (d. 2003)
  1910   – Marguerite Churchill, American actress (d. 2000)
1912 – Arsenio Lacson, Filipino journalist and politician, Mayor of Manila (d. 1962)
1913 – Frank Swift, English footballer and journalist (d. 1958)
1914 – Richard Widmark, American actor (d. 2008)
1915 – Rolf Botvid, Swedish actor and screenwriter (d. 1998) 
1918 – Olga Lopes-Seale, Guyanese-Barbadian singer and radio host (d. 2011)
  1918   – Georgios Rallis, Greek lieutenant and politician, 173rd Prime Minister of Greece (d. 2006)
1921 – Steve Allen, American actor, singer, talk show host, and screenwriter (d. 2000)
  1921   – John Severin, American illustrator (d. 2012)
1922 – Richard Mayes, English actor (d. 2006)
1923 – Richard Artschwager, American painter, illustrator, and sculptor (d. 2013)
1924 – Frank Broyles, American football player, coach, and sportscaster (d. 2017)
1926 – Earle Brown, American composer (d. 2002)
1927 – Denis Gifford, English journalist and historian (d. 2000)
  1927   – Alan King, American actor, producer, and screenwriter (d. 2004)
  1927   – Stu Miller, American baseball player (d. 2015)
  1927   – Denis Quilley, English actor (d. 2003)
1929 – Kathleen Crowley, American actress (d. 2017)
  1929   – Régine Zylberberg, Belgian-French singer and actress (d. 2022)
1930 – Jean Ferrat, French singer-songwriter and poet (d. 2010)
  1930   – Harry Gamble, American football player, coach, and manager (d. 2014)
  1930   – Donald Moffat, English-American actor (d. 2018)
1933 – Caroll Spinney, American puppeteer and voice actor (d. 2019)
1935 – Abdul "Duke" Fakir, American singer
  1935   – Rohan Kanhai, Guyanese cricketer 
  1935   – Norm Ullman, Canadian ice hockey player
1936 – Peep Jänes, Estonian architect
  1936   – Trevor Taylor, English race car driver (d. 2010)
1937 – John Horton Conway, English mathematician, known for Conway's Game of Life (d. 2020)
1938 – Bahram Beyzai, Iranian director, producer, and screenwriter
  1938   – Robert Hamerton-Kelly, South African-American pastor, scholar, and author (d. 2013)
  1938   – Alamgir Kabir, Bangladeshi director, producer, and screenwriter (d. 1989)
  1938   – Mirko Kovač, Yugoslav-Croatian author, playwright, and screenwriter (d. 2013)
1939 – Fred Schepisi, Australian director and screenwriter
  1939   – Phil Spector, American singer-songwriter and producer (d. 2021) 
1940 – Edward C. Prescott, American economist and academic, Nobel Prize laureate (d. 2022)
  1940   – Ray Sadecki, American baseball player (d. 2014)
1941 – Daniel Schmid, Swiss actor, director, and screenwriter (d. 2006)
1942 – Vinicio Cerezo, Guatemalan politician, 28th President of Guatemala
  1942   – Catherine Coulter, American author
  1942   – Gray Davis, American captain, lawyer, and politician, 37th Governor of California
1944 – William Ayers, American academic and activist
1945 – John Walsh, American television host, producer, and activist, created America's Most Wanted
1946 – Alan Frumin, American lawyer and politician
  1946   – Tiit Rosenberg, Estonian historian and academic
1947 – James T. Conway, American general
  1947   – Jean Echenoz, French author 
  1947   – Carlton Fisk, American baseball player
  1947   – Josef Janíček, Czech singer-songwriter, guitarist, and keyboard player
  1947   – Liz Lochhead, Scottish poet and playwright
  1947   – Richard Levis McCormick, American historian and academic
1948 – Candy Crowley, American journalist
1949 – José Ramos-Horta, East Timorese lawyer and politician, 2nd President of East Timor, Nobel Prize laureate
1950 – Raja Pervaiz Ashraf, Pakistani businessman and politician, 17th Prime Minister of Pakistan
  1950   – Mario Mendoza, Mexican baseball player and manager
1953 – Leonel Fernández, Dominican lawyer and politician, 51st President of the Dominican Republic
  1953   – Makis Katsavakis, Greek footballer and manager
  1953   – Toomas Hendrik Ilves, Swedish-Estonian journalist and politician, 4th President of Estonia
  1953   – Henning Schmitz, German drummer
1954 – Peter Hillary, New Zealand mountaineer and philanthropist
  1954   – Ozzie Smith, American baseball player and sportscaster
1955 – Evan Bayh, American lawyer and politician, 46th Governor of Indiana
1956 – David Sedaris, American comedian, author, and radio host
1957 – Dermot Murnaghan, English-Northern Irish journalist and game show host
1958 – Adrian Newey, English aerodynamicist and engineer
1959 – Kōji Morimoto, Japanese animator and director
  1959   – Hans Nielsen, Danish motorcycle racer
  1959   – Wang Lijun, Chinese police officer and politician
1960 – Keith Martin Ball, American mathematician and academic
  1960   – Ruud Kaiser, Dutch footballer and manager
  1960   – Jim Toomey, American cartoonist
  1960   – Cem Uzan, Turkish businessman and politician
1961 – Andrew Lock, Australian mountaineer
  1961   – John Lynch, Northern Irish actor
1962 – Mark Starr, English wrestler (d. 2013)
1963 – Craig Teitzel, Australian rugby league player
  1963   – Lars Ulrich, Danish-American drummer, songwriter, and producer
1964 – Elizabeth Kostova, American author
1966 – Jay Farrar, American singer-songwriter and guitarist
  1966   – Tim Legler, American basketball player and sportscaster
  1966   – Jay Yuenger, American guitarist and producer
1968 – Matt Zoller Seitz, American film critic and author
1969 – Isaac Viciosa, Spanish runner
1970 – James Mercer, American singer-songwriter and guitarist
1971 – Jared Leto, American actor and musician 
  1971   – Mika Nurmela, Finnish footballer
  1971   – Tatiana Sorokko, Russian-American model and journalist
1972 – Esteban Fuertes, Argentinian footballer
  1972   – Robert Muchamore, English author
1973 – Paulo Frederico Benevenute, Brazilian footballer
  1973   – Gianluca Faliva, Italian rugby player
  1973   – Nobuhiko Matsunaka, Japanese baseball player
  1973   – Steve Prescott, English rugby player (d. 2013)
1974 – Joshua John Miller, American actor, director, and screenwriter
1975 – Chris Calaguio, Filipino basketball player
  1975   – Marcelo Ríos, Chilean tennis player
  1975   – María Vasco, Spanish race walker
1976 – Simon Goodwin, Australian footballer and coach
1977 – Fatih Akyel, Turkish footballer and manager
  1977   – Adrienn Hegedűs, Hungarian tennis player
1978 – Karel Rüütli, Estonian lawyer and politician
  1978   – Kaoru Sugayama, Japanese volleyball player
1979 – Fabián Carini, Uruguayan footballer
  1979   – Chris Daughtry, American singer-songwriter and guitarist
  1979   – Dimitry Vassiliev, Russian ski jumper
  1979   – Craig Wing, Australian rugby player
1980 – Todd Dunivant, American soccer player
  1980   – Ceylan Ertem, Turkish singer
1981 – Pablo Canavosio, Argentinian-Italian rugby player
  1981   – Nikolai Nikolaeff, Australian actor
1982 – Kenneth Darby, American football player
  1982   – Noel Hunt, Irish footballer
  1982   – Aksel Lund Svindal, Norwegian skier
1983 – Yu Takahashi, Japanese singer-songwriter
  1983   – Alexander Wang, American fashion designer
1984 – Ahmed Barusso, Ghanaian footballer
  1984   – Leonardo Ghiraldini, Italian rugby player
  1984   – Alex Schwazer, Italian race walker
1985 – Beth Behrs, American actress
1986 – Joe Alexander, American-Israeli basketball player
  1986   – Kit Harington, English actor
  1986   – Hugo Lloris, French footballer
  1986   – Selen Soyder, Turkish actress and beauty queen
1989 – Yohan Blake, Jamaican sprinter
1990 – Jon Bellion, American rapper, singer, songwriter and record producer
  1990   – Andy Biersack, American singer-songwriter 
  1990   – Denis Cheryshev, Russian footballer
  1990   – Aaron Ramsey, Welsh footballer
1991 – Eden Sher, American actress
1992 – Cecilia Costa Melgar, Chilean tennis player
  1992   – Jade Thirlwall, English singer
1994 – Souleymane Coulibaly, Ivorian footballer
1997 – Tamara Zidanšek, Slovenian tennis player

Deaths

Pre-1600
 268 – Dionysius, pope of the Catholic Church
 418 – Zosimus, pope of the Catholic Church
 831 – Euthymius of Sardis, Byzantine bishop and saint (b. 754)
 865 – Zheng, empress of the Tang Dynasty
 893 – Masrur al-Balkhi, Abbasid general 
1006 – Gao Qiong, Chinese general (b. 935)
1191 – Reginald Fitz Jocelin, archbishop-elect of Canterbury
1302 – Valdemar, king of Sweden (b. 1239)
1331 – Philip I, Prince of Taranto, titular Latin Emperor (b. 1278)
1350 – Jean de Marigny, French archbishop
1352 – John, 3rd Earl of Kent, English politician (b. 1330)
1360 – Thomas Holland, 1st Earl of Kent, English commander (b. 1314)
1413 – Michele Steno, doge of Venice (b. 1331)
1441 – Niccolò III d'Este, marquess of Ferrara
1458 – Arthur III, duke of Brittany (b. 1393)
1476 – Galeazzo Maria Sforza, duke of Milan (b. 1444)
1530 – Babur, Mughal emperor (b. 1483)
1574 – Charles de Lorraine, French cardinal (b. 1524)

1601–1900
1646 – Henri de Bourbon, prince of Condé (b. 1588)
1731 – Antoine Houdar de la Motte, French author (b. 1672)
1771 – Claude Adrien Helvétius, French philosopher and activist (b. 1715)
1780 – John Fothergill, English physician and botanist (b. 1712)
1784 – Seth Warner, American colonel (b. 1743)
1786 – Gasparo Gozzi, Italian playwright and critic (b. 1713)
1863 – Francis Caulfeild, 2nd Earl of Charlemont, Irish politician, Lord Lieutenant of Tyrone (b. 1775)
1869 – Jean Léonard Marie Poiseuille, French physician and physiologist (b. 1797)
1890 – Heinrich Schliemann, German-Italian archaeologist and author (b. 1822)

1901–present
1902 – Mary Hartwell Catherwood, American author and poet (b. 1849)
1909 – Frederic Remington, American painter and illustrator (b. 1861)
1923 – Dietrich Eckart, German journalist, poet, and politician (b. 1868)
1925 – Jan Letzel, Czech architect, designed the Hiroshima Peace Memorial (b. 1880)
1929 – Albert Giraud, Belgian poet (b. 1860)
1931 – Melvil Dewey, American librarian and educator, created the Dewey Decimal Classification (b. 1851)
1933 – Anatoly Lunacharsky, Russian journalist and politician (b. 1875)
  1933   – Henry Watson Fowler, English lexicographer and educator (b. 1858)
1959 – Jack Tresadern, English footballer and manager (b. 1890)
1960 – Tetsuro Watsuji, Japanese historian and philosopher (b. 1889)
1963 – Gorgeous George, American wrestler (b. 1915)
1966 – Ina Boudier-Bakker, Dutch author (b. 1875)
  1966   – Herbert Otto Gille, German general (b. 1897)
  1966   – Guillermo Stábile, Argentinian footballer and manager (b. 1905)
1968 – Weegee, Ukrainian-American photographer and journalist (b. 1898)
1970 – Lillian Board, South African-English runner (b. 1948)
1972 – Harry S. Truman, American colonel and politician, 33rd President of the United States (b. 1884)
1973 – Harold B. Lee, American religious leader, 11th President of The Church of Jesus Christ of Latter-day Saints (b. 1899)
1974 – Farid al-Atrash, Syrian-Egyptian singer-songwriter, oud player, and actor (b. 1915)
  1974   – Jack Benny, American comedian, vaudevillian, actor, and violinist (b. 1894)
  1974   – Frederick Dalrymple-Hamilton, Scottish admiral (b. 1890)
1977 – Howard Hawks, American director and screenwriter (b. 1896)
1980 – Tony Smith, American sculptor and educator (b. 1912)
1981 – Amber Reeves, New Zealand-English author and scholar (b. 1887)
  1981   – Suat Hayri Ürgüplü, Turkish politician, Prime Minister of Turkey (b. 1903)
  1981   – Savitri, Indian actress, playback singer, dancer, director and producer (b. 1936)
1983 – Hans Liska, Austrian-German artist (b. 1907)
1986 – Elsa Lanchester, English-American actress (b. 1902)
1987 – Dorothy Bliss, American invertebrate zoologist, curator at the American Museum of Natural History (b. 1916)
1988 – Glenn McCarthy, American businessman, founded the Shamrock Hotel (b. 1907)
  1988   – Pablo Sorozábal, German-Spanish composer and conductor (b. 1897)
1989 – Doug Harvey, Canadian ice hockey player and coach (b. 1924)
1990 – Gene Callahan, American art director and production designer (b. 1923)
1994 – Sylva Koscina, Italian actress (b. 1933)
1996 – JonBenét Ramsey, American child beauty queen and prominent unsolved murder victim (b. 1990)
1997 – Cahit Arf, Turkish mathematician and academic (b. 1910)
  1997   – Cornelius Castoriadis, Greek economist and philosopher (b. 1922)
1998 – Ram Swarup, Indian writer on Hindu philosophy and religion (b. 1920)
1999 – Curtis Mayfield, American singer-songwriter and producer (b. 1942)
  1999   – Shankar Dayal Sharma, Indian academic and politician, 9th President of India (b. 1918)
2000 – Jason Robards, American actor (b. 1922)
2001 – Nigel Hawthorne, English actor (b. 1929)
2002 – Herb Ritts, American photographer and director (b. 1952)
  2002   – Armand Zildjian, American businessman, founded the Avedis Zildjian Company (b. 1921)
2003 – Virginia Coffey, American civil rights activist (b. 1904)
2004 – Jonathan Drummond-Webb, South African surgeon and academic (b. 1959)
  2004   – Angus Ogilvy, English businessman (b. 1928)
  2004   – Reggie White, American football player and wrestler (b. 1961)
Casualties of the 2004 Indian Ocean earthquake and tsunami:
                Troy Broadbridge, Australian footballer (b. 1980)
                Sigurd Køhn, Norwegian saxophonist and composer (b. 1959)
                Mieszko Talarczyk, Polish-Swedish singer-songwriter, guitarist, and producer (b. 1974)
2005 – Muriel Costa-Greenspon, American soprano (b. 1937)
  2005   – Ted Ditchburn, English footballerand manager (b. 1921)
  2005   – Kerry Packer, Australian publisher and businessman (b. 1937)
  2005   – Viacheslav Platonov, Russian volleyball player and coach (b. 1939)
  2005   – Vincent Schiavelli, American actor (b. 1948)
  2005   – Erich Topp, German commander (b. 1914)
2006 – Gerald Ford, American commander, lawyer, and politician, 38th President of the United States (b. 1913)
  2006   – Ivar Formo, Norwegian skier and engineer (b. 1951)
  2006   – Munir Niazi, Indian-Pakistani poet (b. 1928)
2009 – Felix Wurman, American cellist and composer (b. 1958)
2010 – Salvador Jorge Blanco, 48th President of the Dominican Republic (b. 1926)
  2010   – Edward Bhengu, South African activist (b. 1934)
  2010   – Teena Marie, American singer-songwriter and producer (b. 1956)
2011 – Houston Antwine, American football player (b. 1939)
  2011   – Pedro Armendáriz, Jr., Mexican-American actor and producer (b. 1940)
  2011   – Sarekoppa Bangarappa, Indian politician, 15th Chief Minister of Karnataka (b. 1932)
  2011   – Joe Bodolai, American screenwriter and producer (b. 1948)
  2011   – James Rizzi, American painter and illustrator (b. 1950)
2012 – Gerry Anderson, English director, producer, and screenwriter (b. 1929)
  2012   – Gerald McDermott, American author and illustrator (b. 1941)
  2012   – Ibrahim Tannous, Lebanese general (b. 1929)
2013 – Paul Blair, American baseball player and coach (b. 1944)
  2013   – Marta Eggerth, Hungarian-American actress and singer (b. 1912)
2014 – Stanisław Barańczak, Polish-American poet, critic, and scholar (b. 1946)
  2014   – James B. Edwards, American dentist, soldier, and politician, 3rd United States Secretary of Energy (b. 1927)
  2014   – Leo Tindemans, Belgian politician, 43rd Prime Minister of Belgium (b. 1922)
2015 – Sidney Mintz, American anthropologist and academic (b. 1922)
  2015   – Jim O'Toole, American baseball player (b. 1937)
2016 – Ricky Harris, American comedian, actor (b. 1962) 
  2016   – George S. Irving, American actor, singer and dancer (b. 1922)
2017 – Irv Weinstein, American broadcaster and television news anchor (b. 1930)
2020 – Brodie Lee, American Professional Wrestler (b. 1979)
2021 – Giacomo Capuzzi, Italian Roman Catholic prelate, bishop of the Roman Catholic Diocese of Lodi (b. 1929)
  2021   – Paul B. Kidd, Australian author, journalist, and radio show host (b. 1945)
  2021   – Karolos Papoulias, Greek politician, President of Greece from 2005 to 2015 (b. 1929)
  2021   – Desmond Tutu, South African Anglican bishop, theologian and anti-apartheid and human rights activist (b. 1931)
  2021   – Edward O. Wilson, American biologist (b. 1929)

Holidays and observances
Boxing Day, except when December 26 is a Sunday. If it is a Sunday, Boxing Day is transferred to December 27 by Royal Proclamation. (Commonwealth of Nations), and its related observances:
Day of Good Will (South Africa and Namibia)
Family Day (Vanuatu)
Thanksgiving (Solomon Islands)
Christian feast day:
Abadiu of Antinoe (Coptic Church)
Earliest day on which Feast of the Holy Family can fall, celebrated on Sunday after Christmas or 30 if Christmas falls on a Sunday.
James the Just (Eastern Orthodox Church)
Saint Stephen (Western Church)
Synaxis of the Theotokos (Eastern Orthodox Church)
December 26 (Eastern Orthodox liturgics)
Independence and Unity Day (Slovenia)
Mauro Hamza Day (Houston, Texas)
Mummer's Day (Padstow, Cornwall)
St. Stephen's Day (public holiday in Alsace, Austria, Catalonia, Croatia, the Czech Republic, Germany, Hong Kong, Italy, Ireland, Luxembourg, Poland, Slovakia and Switzerland), and its related observances:
Father's Day (Bulgaria)
The first day of Kwanzaa, celebrated until January 1 (United States)
The first day of Junkanoo street parade, the second day is on the New Year's Day (The Bahamas)
The second day of the Twelve Days of Christmas (Western Christianity)
Second day of Christmas (Public holiday in the Netherlands, Poland and Slovakia)
Veer Baal Divas, is observed to pay tribute to martyr sons of Guru Gobind Singh ji.
Wren Day (Ireland and the Isle of Man)

References

External links

 BBC: On This Day
 
 Historical Events on December 26

Days of the year
December